Blood, Sweat and Gears is an Australian television series that airs on Fox8. It debuted on 18 January 2008, and is hosted by Scott McGregor, and judged by Ian Luff and Nathan Luck. In Season II 2009, Luck was replaced with Samantha Stevens.

Fox8 original programming
2008 Australian television series debuts